The 2018 Spa-Francorchamps GP3 Series round was the sixth round of the 2018 GP3 Series. It was held on 25 and 26 August 2018 at Circuit de Spa-Francorchamps in Stavelot, Belgium. The race supported the 2018 Belgian Grand Prix.

Classification

Qualifying

Feature race

Sprint race

Standings after the event 

Drivers' Championship standings

Teams' Championship standings

 Note: Only the top five positions are included for both sets of standings.

References

|- style="text-align:center"
|width="35%"|Previous race:
|width="30%"|GP3 Series2018 season
|width="40%"|Next race:

Spa
GP3
GP3 Spa